Voldsfjorden or Voldafjorden is a fjord in Volda Municipality in Møre og Romsdal county, Norway.

The fjord cuts into the mainland of Norway and it is surrounded by the Sunnmørsalpene mountains. The Dalsfjorden branches off the Voldsfjorden just south of the village of Lauvstad.  

The main urban area along the fjord is the village of Volda, located on the east side of the fjord.  The European route E39 highway runs along the shore of part of the fjord.  The fjord is crossed by two ferries going from Lauvstad to Volda, and Folkestad to Volda.

See also
 List of Norwegian fjords

References

Fjords of Møre og Romsdal
Volda